Andrew Jackson (March 15, 1767 – June 8, 1845) was an American lawyer, planter, general, and statesman who served as the seventh president of the United States from 1829 to 1837. Before being elected to the presidency, he gained fame as a general in the U.S. Army and served in both houses of the U.S. Congress. Although often praised as an advocate for ordinary Americans and for his work in preserving the union of states, Jackson has also been criticized for his racial policies, particularly his treatment of Native Americans. 

Jackson was born in the colonial Carolinas before the American Revolutionary War. He became a frontier lawyer and married Rachel Donelson Robards. He briefly served in the U.S. House of Representatives and the U.S. Senate, representing Tennessee. After resigning, he served as a justice on the Tennessee Supreme Court from 1798 until 1804. Jackson purchased a property later known as the Hermitage, becoming a wealthy planter who owned hundreds of African American slaves. In 1801, he was appointed colonel of the Tennessee militia and was elected its commander the following year. He led troops during the Creek War of 1813–1814, winning the Battle of Horseshoe Bend. The subsequent Treaty of Fort Jackson required the Creek to surrender vast tracts of present-day Alabama and Georgia. In the concurrent war against the British, Jackson's victory at the Battle of New Orleans in 1815 made him a national hero. He later commanded U.S. forces in the First Seminole War, which led to the annexation of Florida from Spain. Jackson briefly served as Florida's first territorial governor before returning to the Senate. He ran for president in 1824, winning a plurality of the popular and electoral vote, but no candidate won an electoral majority. In a contingent election, the House of Representatives elected John Quincy Adams with Henry Clay's support. Jackson's supporters alleged that there was a "corrupt bargain" between Adams and Clay and began creating their own political organization that would eventually become the Democratic Party.

Jackson ran again in 1828, defeating Adams in a landslide. In 1830, he signed the Indian Removal Act. This act, which has been described as ethnic cleansing, displaced tens of thousands of Native Americans from their ancestral homelands east of the Mississippi and resulted in thousands of deaths. Under Jackson, the integrity of the federal union was challenged when South Carolina threatened to nullify a high protective tariff set by the federal government. He threatened the use of military force to enforce the tariff, but the crisis was defused when it was amended. In 1832, he vetoed a bill by Congress to reauthorize the Second Bank of the United States, arguing that it was a corrupt institution that benefited the wealthy. After a lengthy struggle, he and his allies dismantled the Bank. In 1835, Jackson became the only president to pay off the national debt. He also survived the first assassination attempt on a sitting president. In one of his final presidential acts, he recognized the Republic of Texas.

In his retirement, Jackson stayed active in politics. He supported the presidencies of Martin Van Buren and James K. Polk, as well as the annexation of Texas, which was accomplished shortly before his death. Jackson's legacy remains controversial, and opinions on him are frequently polarized. Supporters characterize him as a defender of democracy and the constitution, while critics point to his reputation as a demagogue who ignored the law when it suited him. Scholars and historians have consistently ranked Jackson's presidency as significantly above-average, although his reputation among experts has significantly declined since the late 20th century.

Early life and education
Andrew Jackson was born on March 15, 1767, in the Waxhaws region of the Carolinas. His parents were Scots-Irish colonists Andrew Jackson and Elizabeth Hutchinson, Presbyterians who had emigrated from Ulster, Ireland, in 1765. Jackson's father was born in Carrickfergus, County Antrim, around 1738, and his ancestors had crossed into Northern Ireland from Scotland after the Battle of the Boyne in 1690. Jackson had two older brothers who came with his parents from Ireland, Hugh (born 1763) and Robert (born 1764).

Jackson's exact birthplace is unclear. Jackson's father died at the age of 29 in a logging accident while clearing land in February 1767, three weeks before his son Andrew was born. Afterwards, Elizabeth and her three sons moved in with her sister and brother-in-law, Jane and James Crawford. Jackson later stated that he was born on the Crawford plantation, which is in Lancaster County, South Carolina, but second-hand evidence suggests that he might have been born at another uncle's home in North Carolina.

When Jackson was young, Elizabeth thought he might become a minister and paid to have him schooled by a local clergyman. He learned to read, write, work with numbers, and was exposed to Greek and Latin, but he was too strong-willed and hot-tempered for the ministry.

Revolutionary War service

Jackson and his older brothers, Hugh and Robert, performed military service against the British during the Revolutionary War. Hugh served with Colonel William Richardson Davie, dying from heat exhaustion after the Battle of Stono Ferry in June 1779. After anti-British sentiment intensified following the Waxhaws Massacre on May 29, 1780, Elizabeth encouraged Andrew and Robert to participate in militia drills. They served as couriers and scouts, and participated with Davie in the Battle of Hanging Rock on August 6, 1780.

Andrew and Robert were captured in April 1781 when the British occupied the home of a Crawford relative. The British officer in command demanded to have his boots polished. Andrew refused, and the officer slashed him with a sword, leaving him with scars on his left hand and head. Robert also refused and was struck a blow on the head. The brothers were taken to a prison camp in Camden, where they were malnourished and contracted smallpox. In late spring, the brothers were released to their mother in an exchange. Robert died two days after arriving home, but Elizabeth was able to nurse Andrew back to health. Once he recovered, Elizabeth volunteered to nurse American prisoners of war housed in British prison ships in the Charleston harbor. She contracted cholera and died soon afterwards. She was buried in an unmarked grave. The war not only made Jackson an orphan at age 14, but led him to despise values he associated with Britain, particularly aristocracy and political privilege.

Early career

Legal career and marriage

After the Revolutionary War, Jackson worked as a saddler, briefly returned to school, and taught reading and writing to children. In 1784, he left the Waxhaws region for Salisbury, North Carolina, where he studied law under attorney Spruce Macay. He completed his training under John Stokes, and was admitted to the North Carolina bar in September 1787. Shortly thereafter, his friend John McNairy helped him get appointed as a prosecuting attorney in the Western District of North Carolina, which would later become the state of Tennessee. While traveling to assume his new position, Jackson stopped in Jonesborough. While there, he bought his first slave, a woman who was around his age. He also fought his first duel, accusing another lawyer, Waightstill Avery, of impugning his character. The duel ended with both men firing in the air.

Jackson began his new career in the frontier town of Nashville in 1788 and quickly moved up in social status. He became a protégé of William Blount, one of the most powerful men in the territory. Jackson was appointed attorney general in 1791 and judge advocate for the militia the following year. He also got involved in land speculation, eventually forming a partnership with fellow lawyer John Overton. Their partnership mainly dealt with claims made under a 'land grab' act of 1783 that opened Cherokee and Chickasaw territory to North Carolina's white residents.

While boarding at the home of Rachel Stockly Donelson, the widow of John Donelson, Jackson became acquainted with their daughter, Rachel Donelson Robards. The younger Rachel was in an unhappy marriage with Captain Lewis Robards, and the two were separated by 1789. After the separation, Jackson and Rachel became romantically involved, living together as husband and wife. Robards petitioned for divorce, which was granted on the basis of Rachel's infidelity. The couple legally married in January 1794.

Early public career
Jackson became a member of the Democratic-Republican Party, the dominant party in Tennessee. He was elected as a delegate to the Tennessee constitutional convention in 1796. When Tennessee achieved statehood that year, he was elected to be its U.S. representative. In Congress, Jackson argued against the Jay Treaty, criticized George Washington for allegedly removing Democratic-Republicans from public office, and joined several other Democratic-Republican congressmen in voting against a resolution of thanks for Washington. He advocated for the right of Tennesseans to militarily oppose Native American interests. The state legislature elected him to be a U.S. senator in 1797, but he resigned after serving only six months.

Upon returning to Tennessee, Jackson was elected as a judge of the Tennessee superior court.
In 1802, he also became major general, or commander, of the Tennessee militia, a position that was determined by a vote of the militia's officers. The vote was tied between Jackson and John Sevier, a popular Revolutionary War veteran and former governor, but the current state governor, Archibald Roane, broke the tie in Jackson's favor. Jackson later accused Sevier of fraud and bribery. Sevier responded by impugning Rachel's honor, resulting in a shootout on a public street. Soon afterwards, they met to duel, but parted without having fired at each other.

Planting career and slavery

Jackson resigned his judgeship in 1804. He had almost gone bankrupt when the credit he used for land speculation collapsed in the wake of an earlier financial panic. He focused on recovering from his losses by becoming a successful planter and merchant.

Like most planters in the Southern United States, Jackson used slave labor. In 1804, Jackson had nine African American slaves; by 1820, he had over 100; and by his death in 1845, he had over 150. Over his lifetime, he owned a total of 300 slaves. Jackson subscribed to the paternalistic idea of slavery, which claimed that slave ownership was morally acceptable as long as slaves were treated with humanity and their basic needs were cared for. In practice, slaves were treated as a form of wealth whose productivity needed to be protected. Slaves who disobeyed or ran away could be harshly punished. For example, in an 1804 advertisement to recover a runaway slave, Jackson offered "ten dollars extra, for every hundred lashes any person will give him, to the amount of three hundred". Jackson also participated in the local slave trade. Over time, his accumulation of wealth in both slaves and land placed him among the elite families of Tennessee.

Duel with Dickinson and adventure with Burr 
In May 1806, Jackson fought a duel with Charles Dickinson. They had gotten into an argument over a horse race, and Dickinson allegedly uttered a slur against Rachel. During the duel, Dickinson fired first, and the bullet hit Jackson in the chest. The wound was not life-threatening because the bullet had shattered against his breastbone. Jackson returned fire and killed Dickinson. The killing tarnished Jackson's reputation.

Later in the year, Jackson became involved in former vice president Aaron Burr's plan to conquer Spanish Florida and drive the Spanish from Texas. Jackson had first gotten to know Burr in 1805 when he stayed with the Jacksons at the Hermitage during a tour of what was then the Western United States that he had embarked on after mortally wounding Alexander Hamilton in the Burr–Hamilton duel. Burr eventually persuaded Jackson to join his adventure. In October 1806, Jackson wrote James Winchester that the United States "can conquer not only the Floridas [at that time there was an East Florida and a West Florida], but all Spanish North America". He informed the Tennessee militia that it should be ready to march at a moment's notice "when the government and constituted authority of our country require it", and agreed to provide boats and provisions for the expedition. Jackson sent a letter to president Thomas Jefferson telling him that Tennessee was ready to defend the nation's honor.

Jackson also expressed uncertainty about the enterprise. He warned the Governor of Louisiana William Claiborne and Tennessee Senator Daniel Smith that some of the people involved in the adventure might be intending to break away from the United States. In December, Jefferson ordered Burr to be arrested for treason. Jackson, safe from arrest because of his extensive paper trail, organized the militia to capture the conspirators. Jackson testified before a grand jury at Burr's trial in 1807, implying that it was Burr's associate James Wilkinson who was guilty of treason, not Burr. Burr was acquitted of the charges.

Military career

War of 1812

Creek War

On June 18, 1812, the United States declared war on the United Kingdom. Though the causes of the War of 1812 were primarily about maritime issues, the war provided the white settlers on the southern frontier the opportunity to overcome Native American resistance to settlement, undermine British support of the Native American tribes, and pry Florida from the Spanish.

Jackson immediately offered to raise volunteers for the war, but he was not called to duty until after the United States military was repeatedly defeated in the American Northwest. After these defeats, in January 1813, Jackson enlisted over 2,000 volunteers, who were ordered to head to New Orleans to defend against a British attack. When his forces arrived at Natchez, they were ordered to halt by General Wilkinson, the commander at New Orleans and the man Jackson accused of treason after the Burr adventure. A little later, Jackson received a letter from the Secretary of War, John Armstrong, stating that his volunteers were not needed, and that they were to be disbanded and any supplies were to be handed over to Wilkinson. Jackson refused to disband his troops; instead, he led them on the difficult march back to Nashville, earning the nickname "Hickory" (later "Old Hickory") for his toughness.

After returning to Nashville, Jackson and one of his colonels, John Coffee, got into a street brawl over honor with the brothers Jesse and Thomas Hart Benton. Nobody was killed, but Jackson received a gunshot in the shoulder that nearly killed him.

Jackson had not fully recovered from his wounds when Governor Blount called out the militia in September 1813 following the August Fort Mims Massacre. The Red Sticks, a confederate faction that had allied with Tecumseh, a Shawnee chief who was fighting with the British against the United States, killed about 250 militia men and civilians at Fort Mims in retaliation for an ambush by American militia at Burnt Corn Creek.

Jackson's objective was to destroy the Red Sticks. He headed south from Fayetteville, Tennessee in October with 2,500 militia, establishing Fort Strother as his supply base. He sent his cavalry under General Coffee ahead of the main force, destroying Red Stick villages and capturing supplies. On November 3, Coffee defeated a band of Red Sticks at the Battle of Tallushatchee. Later in the month, Jackson defeated another band of Red Sticks who were besieging Creek allies at the Battle of Talladega.

By January 1814, the expiration of enlistments and desertion had reduced Jackson's force by about 1,000 volunteers, but Jackson continued the offensive. The Red Sticks counterattacked at the Battles of Emuckfaw and Enotachopo Creek. Jackson repelled them, but he was forced to withdraw to Fort Strother. Jackson's army was reinforced by further recruitment and the addition of regular army unit, the 39th U. S. Infantry Regiment commanded by Colonel John Williams. The combined force of 3000 men—including Cherokee, Choctaw, and Creek allies–attacked a fort the Red Sticks had built at Horseshoe Bend on the Tallapoosa River. Jackson's forces numbered over 3,000 men; the Red Sticks had about 1,000. The Red Sticks were overwhelmed and massacred. Almost all their warriors were killed, and nearly 300 women and children were taken prisoner and distributed to Jackson's Native American allies. The victory broke the power of the Red Sticks. Jackson continued his scorched-earth campaign of burning villages, destroying supplies, and starving Red Stick women and children. The campaign ended when William Weatherford, the Red Stick leader, surrendered, although some Red Sticks fled to East Florida. 

On June 8, Jackson was appointed a brigadier general in the United States Army, and 10 days later was made a brevet major general with command of the Seventh Military District, which included Tennessee, Louisiana, the Mississippi Territory, and the Muscogee Creek Confederacy. With President James Madison's approval, Jackson imposed the Treaty of Fort Jackson. The treaty required all Creek, including those who had remained allies, to surrender  of land to the United States.

Jackson then turned his attention to the British and Spanish. He moved his forces to Mobile, Alabama in August. He accused the Spanish governor of West Florida, Mateo González Manrique, of arming the Red Sticks and threatened to attack. The governor responded by inviting the British to land at Pensacola to defend it, which violated Spanish neutrality. The British attempted to capture Mobile, but their invasion fleet was repulsed at Fort Bowyer, located at the mouth of Mobile Bay. Jackson then invaded Florida, defeating the Spanish and British forces at the Battle of Pensacola on November 7. Afterwards, the Spanish surrendered and the British withdrew. Weeks later, Jackson learned that the British were planning an attack on New Orleans, which was the gateway to the Lower Mississippi River and control of the American West. He evacuated Pensacola, strengthened the garrison at Mobile, and led his troops to New Orleans.

Battle of New Orleans

Jackson arrived in New Orleans on December 1, 1814. There he instituted martial law because he worried about the loyalty of the city's Creole and Spanish inhabitants. He augmented his force by forming an alliance with Jean Lafitte's smugglers and raising units of free African Americans and Creek, paying non-white volunteers the same salary as whites. This gave Jackson a force of about 5,000 men when the British arrived.

The British arrived in New Orleans in mid-December. Admiral Cochrane was the overall commander of the operation; General Edward Pakenham commanded the army of 10,000 soldiers, many of whom had served in the Napoleonic Wars. As the British advanced up the east bank of the Mississippi River, Jackson constructed a fortified position to block them. The climactic battle took place on January 8 when the British launched a frontal assault. Their troops made easy targets for the Americans protected by their parapets, and the attack ended in disaster. General Packenham was killed and the British suffered over 2,000 casualties; the Americans had suffered about 60 casualties.

The British decamped from New Orleans at the end of January, but they still remained a threat. Jackson refused to lift martial law and kept the militia under arms. He approved the execution of six militiamen for desertion. Some Creoles registered as French citizens with the French consul and demanded to be discharged from the militia due to their foreign nationality. Jackson then ordered all French citizens to leave the city within three days, and had a member of the Louisiana legislature, Louis Louaillier, arrested when he wrote a newspaper article criticizing Jackson's continuation of martial law. U.S. District Court Judge Dominic A. Hall signed a writ of habeas corpus for Louailler's release. Jackson had Hall arrested too. A military court ordered Louiallier's release, but Jackson kept him in prison and evicted Hall from the city. Although Jackson lifted martial law when he received official word that the Treaty of Ghent, which ended the war with the British, had been signed, his previous behavior tainted his reputation in New Orleans.

Jackson's victory made him a national hero, and on February 27, 1815, he was given the Thanks of Congress and awarded a Congressional Gold Medal. Though the Treaty of Ghent had been signed in December 1814 before the Battle of New Orleans was fought, Jackson's victory assured that the United States control of the region between Mobile and New Orleans would not be effectively contested by European powers. This control allowed the American government to ignore one of the articles in the treaty, which would have returned the Creek lands taken in the Treaty of Fort Jackson.

First Seminole War

Following the war, Jackson remained in command of troops in the southern half of the United States and was permitted to make his headquarters at the Hermitage. Jackson continued to displace the Native Americans in areas under his command. Despite resistance from the Secretary of the Treasury William Crawford, who tried to help the Native Americans retain their land, Jackson signed five treaties between 1816 and 1820, including the Treaty of Tuscaloosa and the Treaty of Doak's Stand, in which the Creek, Choctaw, Cherokee and Chickasaw ceded tens of millions of acres of land to the United States.

Jackson would soon find himself embroiled in conflict in the Floridas. The former British post at  Prospect Bluff, which became known to Americans as “the Negro fort”, remained occupied by more than a thousand former soldiers of the British Royal and Colonial Marines, escaped slaves, and various indigenous peoples. It had become a magnet for escapees and was seen as a threat to the property rights of American enslavers, even a potential source of insurrection by enslaved people.
Jackson ordered Colonel Duncan Clinch to capture the fort in July 1816. He destroyed it and killed many of the garrison. Some survivors were enslaved while others fled into the wilderness of Florida. 

In addition, White settlers were in constant conflict with Native American people collectively known as the Seminoles, who straddled the border between the U.S. and Florida. In December 1817, Secretary of War John C. Calhoun initiated what would be called the First Seminole War by ordering Jackson to lead a campaign "with full power to conduct the war as he may think best". Jackson believed the best way to do this was to seize Florida from Spain once and for all. Before departing, Jackson wrote to President James Monroe, "Let it be signified to me through any channel ... that the possession of the Floridas would be desirable to the United States, and in sixty days it will be accomplished."

Jackson invaded Florida, captured the Spanish fort of St. Marks, and occupied Pensacola. Seminole and Spanish resistance was effectively ended by May 1818. He also captured two British agents, Robert Ambrister and Alexander Arbuthnot, who had been working with the Seminoles. After a brief trial, Jackson executed both of them, causing a diplomatic incident with the British. Jackson's actions polarized Monroe's cabinet. The occupied territories were returned to Spain. Calhoun wanted him censured for violating the Constitution, since the United States had not declared war on Spain. Secretary of State John Quincy Adams defended him as he thought Jackson's occupation of Pensacola would lead Spain to sell Florida, which Spain did in the Adams–Onís Treaty of 1819. In February 1819, a congressional investigation exonerated Jackson,  and his victory was instrumental in convincing the Seminoles to sign Treaty of Moultrie Creek in 1823, which surrendered much of their land in Florida.

Presidential aspirations

Election of 1824

In 1819, mismanagement by the Second Bank of the United States created a financial panic that sent the U.S. into its first prolonged financial depression. The United States reduced its military and Jackson was forced to retire from his major general position. In compensation, Monroe made him the first territorial governor of Florida in 1821. Jackson served as the governor for two months, returning to the Hermitage in ill health. During his convalescence, Jackson, who had been a Freemason since at least 1798, became the Grand Master of the Grand Lodge of Tennessee for 1822–1823. Around this time, he also completed negotiations for Tennessee to purchase Chickasaw lands. This became known as the Jackson Purchase. Jackson, Overton, and another colleague had speculated in some of the land and used their portion to found the town of Memphis.

In 1822, Jackson accepted a plan by Overton to nominate him as a candidate for the 1824 presidential election, and he was nominated by the Tennessee legislature in July. At the time, the Federalist Party had collapsed, and there were four major contenders for the Democratic-Republican Party nomination: William Crawford, John Quincy Adams, Henry Clay and John C. Calhoun. Jackson was intended to be a stalking horse candidate to prevent Tennessee's electoral votes from going to Crawford, who was seen as a Washington insider. Unexpectedly, Jackson garnered popular support outside of Tennessee and became a serious candidate. He benefited from the expansion of suffrage among white males that followed the conclusion of the War of 1812. He was a popular war hero whose reputation suggested he had the decisiveness and independence to bring change to how the government was run. He also was promoted as a Washington outsider who stood for all the people, blaming banks for the country's depression.

During his presidential candidacy, Jackson relunctantly ran for one of Tennessee's U.S. Senate seats. William Berkeley Lewis and the other U.S. senator John Eaton, who were Jackson's political managers, convinced him that he needed to defeat incumbent John Williams, who openly opposed Jackson. The legislature elected him in October 1823. Jackson was attentive to his senatorial duties. He was appointed chairman of the Committee on Military Affairs, but avoided debate or initiating legislation. He used his time in the Senate to form alliances and make peace with old adversaries. Eaton continued to campaign for Jackson's presidency, updating his biography, and writing letters under a pseudonym that were quoted in newspapers around the country and so popular that they were reprinted in pamphlet form—Jackson himself had a part in their composition.

Democratic-Republican presidential nominees had historically been chosen by informal congressional nominating caucuses. In 1824, most of the Democratic-Republicans in Congress boycotted the caucus, and the power to choose nominees was shifting to state nominating committees and legislatures. Jackson was nominated by a Pennsylvania convention, making him not merely a regional candidate from the west but the leading national contender. When Jackson won the Pennsylvania nomination, Calhoun dropped out of the presidential race. Afterwards, Jackson won the nomination in six other states and had a strong second-place finish in three others.

In the presidential election, Jackson won a plurality of the popular vote, receiving 42 percent. More importantly, he won a plurality of electoral votes, receiving 99 votes from states in the South, West, and Mid-Atlantic. He was the only candidate to win states outside of his regional base: Adams dominated New England, Crawford won Virginia and Georgia, and Clay took three western states. Because no candidate had a majority of 131 of electoral votes, the House of Representatives held a contingent election under the terms of the Twelfth Amendment. The amendment specifies that only the top three electoral vote-winners are eligible to be elected by the House, so Clay was eliminated from contention. Clay, who was also Speaker of the House and presided over the election's resolution, saw a Jackson presidency as a disaster for the country. Clay threw his support behind Adams, who won the contingent election on the first ballot. Adams appointed Clay as his Secretary of State, leading supporters of Jackson to accuse Clay and Adams of having struck a "corrupt bargain". After the Congressional session concluded, Jackson resigned his Senate seat and returned to Tennessee.

Election of 1828 and death of Rachel Jackson

After the election, Jackson's supporters formed a new party to undermine Adams and ensure he served only one term. Adams's presidency went poorly, and Adams's behavior undermined it. He was perceived as an intellectual elite who ignored the needs of the populace. He was unable to accomplish anything because Congress blocked his proposals. In his First Annual Message to Congress, Adams stated that "we are palsied by the will of our constituents", which was interpreted as his being against representative democracy. Jackson responded by championing the needs of ordinary citizens and declaring that "the voice of the people... must be heard".

Jackson was nominated for president by the Tennessee legislature in October 1825, more than three years before the 1828 election. He gained powerful supporters in both the south and north, including Calhoun, who became Jackson's vice presidential running mate, and New York Senator Martin Van Buren. Meanwhile, Adams's support from the Southern states was eroded when he signed a tax on European imports, the Tariff of 1828, which was called the "Tariff of Abominations" by opponents, into law. Jackson's victory in the presidential race was overwhelming. He won 56 percent of the popular vote and 68 percent of the electoral vote. The election ended the one-party system that had formed during the Era of Good Feelings as Jackson's supporters coalesced into the Democratic Party and the various groups who did not support him eventually formed the Whig Party.

The political campaign was dominated by the personal abuse that partisans flung at both candidates. Jackson was accused of being the son of an English prostitute and a mulatto, and he was labeled a slave trader who trafficked in human flesh. A series of pamphlets known as the Coffin Handbills accused him of having murdered 18 white men, including the soldiers he had executed for desertion and alleging that he stabbed a man in the back with his cane. They stated that he had intentionally massacred Native American women and children at the Battle of Horseshoe Bend, ate the bodies of Native Americans he killed in battle, and threatened to cut off the ears of congressmen who questioned his behavior during the First Seminole War.

Jackson and Rachel were accused of adultery for living together before her divorce was finalized, and Rachel heard about the accusation. She had been under stress throughout the election, and just as Jackson was preparing to head to Washington for his inauguration, she fell ill. She did not live to see her husband become president, dying of a stroke or heart attack a few days later, and was buried on Christmas Eve. Jackson believed that the abuse from Adams' supporters had hastened her death, stating at her funeral: "May God Almighty forgive her murderers, as I know she forgave them. I never can."

Presidency (1829–1837)

Inauguration

Jackson arrived in Washington on February 11. His first concern was forming his cabinet. He chose Van Buren as Secretary of State, his friend John Eaton as Secretary of War, Samuel D. Ingham as Secretary of Treasury, John Branch as Secretary of Navy, John M. Berrien as Attorney General, and William T. Barry as Postmaster General. Jackson was inaugurated on March 4, 1829, becoming the first president-elect to take the oath of office on the East Portico of the U.S. Capitol. Embittered by his defeat, Adams refused to attend. In his inaugural address, Jackson promised to protect the sovereignty of the states, respect the limits of the presidency, reform the government by removing disloyal or incompetent appointees, and observe a fair policy toward Native Americans. Jackson invited the public to the White House, which was promptly overrun by well-wishers who caused minor damage to its furnishings. The spectacle earned him the nickname "King Mob".

Reforms and rotation in office

Jackson's administration believed that Adams's had been corrupt and one of Jackson's first acts as president was to initiate investigations into all executive departments. The investigations revealed that $280,000 (equivalent to  today) was stolen from the Treasury, and the reduction in costs to the Department of the Navy saved it $1 million. One of the people caught in his investigation was the Treasury Auditor Tobias Watkins, a personal friend of Adams' who was found guilty of embezzlement. In the first year of his term Jackson asked Congress to tighten laws on embezzlement, revise laws to reduce tax evasion, and pushed for an improved government accounting system.

Jackson implemented a principle he called "rotation in office" by enforcing the Tenure of Office Act, signed by President Monroe in 1820, that limited appointed office tenure and authorized the president to remove and appoint political party associates. The previous custom had been for the president to leave the existing appointees in office, replacing them through attrition. During his first year in office, Jackson removed hundreds of federal officials, which was about 10% of all Federal employees, and replaced them with loyal Democrats. He argued that rotation in office was a democratic reform that reduced bureaucracy and corruption by preventing hereditary officeholding and made officeholders responsible to the popular will, but it functioned as political patronage, which came to be known as the spoils system.

Petticoat affair

Jackson spent much of his time during his first two and a half years in office dealing with what came to be known as the "Petticoat Affair" or "Eaton Affair". The affair focused on Secretary of War Eaton's wife, Margaret. She had a reputation for being promiscuous, and like Rachel Jackson, she was accused of adultery. She and Eaton had been close before her first husband John Timberlake died, and they married nine months after his death. With the exception of Barry's wife Catherine, the cabinet members' wives followed the lead of Vice-president Calhoun's wife Floride and refused to socialize with the Eatons. Though Jackson defended Margaret, her presence split the cabinet, which had been so ineffective that he rarely called it into session, and the ongoing disagreement led to its dissolution.

In the spring of 1831, Jackson demanded the resignations of all the cabinet members except Barry, who would resign in 1835 when a Congressional investigation revealed his mismanagement of the Post Office. Jackson tried to compensate Van Buren by appointing him the Minister to Great Britain, but Calhoun blocked the nomination with a tie-breaking vote against it. Van Buren—along with Amos Kendall, who helped organize what would become the Democratic Party, and Francis Preston Blair, the editor of The Globe newspaper that served as Jackson's house organ,—would become regular participants in Jackson's Kitchen Cabinet, an unofficial, varying group of advisors that Jackson turned to for decision making even after he had formed a new official cabinet.

Indian Removal Act

Jackson's presidency marked the beginning of a national policy of Native American removal. Before Jackson took office, the relationship between the southern states and the Native American tribes who lived within their boundaries was strained. The states felt that they had full jurisdiction over their territories; the native tribes saw themselves as autonomous nations that had a right to the land they lived on. Significant portions of the five major tribes in the Southwest—the Cherokee, Choctaw, Chickasaw, Creek, and Seminoles— began to adopt white culture, including education, agricultural techniques, a road system, and rudimentary manufacturing. In the case of the tensions between the state of Georgia and the Cherokee, Adams had tried to address the issue encouraging Cherokee emigration west of the Mississippi through financial incentives, but most refused.

In the first days of Jackson's presidency, some of the southern states had passed legislation extending state jurisdiction to Native American lands. Jackson supported the states' right to do so. His position was later made clear in the 1832 Supreme Court test case of this legislation, Worcester v. Georgia. Georgia had arrested a group of missionaries for entering Cherokee territory without a permit; the Cherokee declared these arrests illegal. The court under Chief Justice John Marshall decided in favor of the Cherokee: imposition of Georgia law on the Cherokee was unconstitutional. Horace Greeley alleges that when Jackson heard the ruling, he said, "Well, John Marshall has made his decision, but now let him enforce it." Although the quote may be apocryphal, Jackson made it clear he would not use the federal government to enforce the ruling.

Jackson used the power of the federal government to enforce the separation of the Native American tribes and whites. In May 1830, Jackson passed the Indian Removal Act through Congress. It gave the president the right to negotiate treaties to buy tribal lands in the eastern part of the United States in exchange for lands set aside for Native Americans west of the Mississippi, as well as broad discretion on how to use the federal funds allocated to the negotiations. The law was supposed to be a voluntary relocation program, but it was not implemented as one. Jackson's administration often achieved agreement to relocate through bribes, fraud and intimidation, and the leaders who signed the treaties often did not represent the entire tribe. The relocations could be a source of misery too: the Choctaw relocation was rife with corruption, theft, and mismanagement that brought great suffering to that people.

In 1830, Jackson personally negotiated with the Chickasaw, who quickly agreed to move. In the same year, Choctaw leaders signed the Treaty of Dancing Rabbit Creek; the majority did not want the treaty but complied with its terms. In 1832, Seminole leaders signed the Treaty of Payne's Landing, which stipulated that the Seminoles would move west and become part of the Muscogee Creek Confederacy if they found the new land suitable. Most Seminoles refused to move, leading to the Second Seminole War in 1835 that lasted six years. Members of the Muscogee Creek Confederacy ceded their land to the state of Alabama in the Treaty of Cusseta of 1832. Their private ownership of the land was to be protected, but the federal government did not enforce this. The government did encourage voluntary removal until the Creek War of 1836, after which almost all Creek were removed to Oklahoma territory. In 1836, Cherokee leaders ceded their land to the government by the Treaty of New Echota. Their removal, known as the Trail of Tears, was enforced by Jackson's successor, Van Buren.

Jackson also applied the removal policy in the Northwest. He was not successful in removing the Iroquois Confederacy in New York, but when some members of the Meskwaki (Fox) and the Sauk triggered the Black Hawk War by trying to cross back to the east side of the Mississippi, the peace treaties ratified after their defeat reduced their lands further.

During his administration, he made about 70 treaties with American Indian tribes. He had removed almost all the Native Americans east of the Mississippi and south of Lake Michigan, about 70,000 people, from the United States; though it was done at the cost of thousands of Native American lives lost because of the unsanitary conditions and epidemics arising from their dislocation, as well as their resistance to expulsion. Jackson's implementation of the Indian Removal Act contributed to his popularity with his constituency. He added over 170,000 square miles of land to the public domain, which primarily benefited the United States' agricultural interests. The act also benefited small farmers, as Jackson allowed them to purchase moderate plots at low prices and offered squatters on land formerly belonging to Native Americans the option to purchase it before it was offered for sale to others.

Nullification crisis

Jackson had to confront another challenge that had been building up since the beginning of his first term. The Tariff of 1828, which had been passed in the last year of Adams' administration, set a protective tariff at a very high rate to prevent the manufacturing industries in the Northern states from having to compete with lower-priced imports from Britain. The tariff reduced the income of southern cotton planters: it propped up consumer prices, but not the price of cotton which had severely declined in the previous decade. Immediately after the tariff's passage, the South Carolina Exposition and Protest was sent to the U.S. Senate. This document, which had been anonymously written by John C. Calhoun, asserted that the constitution was a compact of individual states and when the federal government went beyond its delegated duties, such as enacting a protective tariff, a state had a right to declare this action unconstitutional and make the act null and void with the borders of that state.

Jackson suspected Calhoun of writing the Exposition and Protest, and opposed his interpretation. Jackson argued that Congress as a whole had full authority to enact tariffs and that a dissenting state was denying the will of the majority. He also needed the tariff, which generated 90% of the federal revenue, to achieve another of his presidential goals, eliminating the national debt. The issue developed into a personal rivalry between the two men. For example, during a celebration of Thomas Jefferson's birthday on April 13, 1830, the attendees gave after-dinner toasts. Jackson toasted: "Our federal Union: It must be preserved!" – a clear challenge to nullification. Calhoun whose toast immediately followed, rebutted: "The Union: Next to our Liberty, the most dear!"

As a compromise, Jackson supported the Tariff of 1832, which reduced the duties from the Tariff of 1828 by almost half. The bill was signed on July 9, but failed to satisfy extremists on either side. On November 24, South Carolina had passed the Ordinance of Nullification, declaring both tariffs null and void and threatening to secede from the United States if the federal government tried to use force to collect the duties. In response, Jackson sent warships to Charleston harbor, and threatened to hang any man who worked to support nullification or secession.

On December 10, Jackson issued a proclamation against the "nullifiers", stating that he considered "the power to annul a law of the United States, assumed by one State, incompatible with the existence of the Union, contradicted expressly by the letter of the Constitution, unauthorized by its spirit, inconsistent with every principle on which it was founded, and destructive of the great object for which it was formed". South Carolina, the president declared, stood on "the brink of insurrection and treason", and he appealed to the people of the state to reassert their allegiance to that Union. Jackson also denied the right of secession: "The Constitution ... forms a government not a league ... To say that any State may at pleasure secede from the Union is to say that the United States are not a nation." On December 28, Calhoun, who had been elected to the U.S. Senate, resigned as vice president.

Jackson asked Congress to pass a "Force Bill" authorizing the military to enforce the tariff. It was attacked by Calhoun as despotism. Meanwhile, Calhoun and Clay began to work on a new compromise tariff. Jackson saw it as an effective way to end the confrontation, but insisted on the passage of the Force Bill before he signed. On March 2, he signed into law the Force Bill and the Tariff of 1833, both of which passed on March 1, 1833. The South Carolina Convention then met and rescinded its nullification ordinance, but nullified the Force Bill in a final act of defiance. Two months later, Jackson reflected on South Carolina's nullification: "the tariff was only the pretext, and disunion and southern confederacy the real object. The next pretext will be the negro, or slavery question".

Bank War and Election of 1832

Bank Veto

A few weeks after his inauguration, Jackson started looking into how he could replace the Second Bank of the United States. The Bank had been chartered by President Madison in 1816 to restore the United States economy after the War of 1812. Monroe had appointed Nicholas Biddle as the Bank's executive. The Bank was a repository for the country's public monies which also serviced the national debt; it was formed as a for-profit entity that looked after the concerns of its shareholders. Under the Bank's stewardship, the country was economically healthy and the currency was stable, but Jackson saw the Bank as a fourth branch of government run by an elite, what he called the "money power" that sought to control the labor and earnings of the "real people", who depend on their own efforts to succeed: the planters, farmers, mechanics, and laborers. Additionally, Jackson's own near bankruptcy in 1804 due to credit-fuelled land speculation had biased him against paper money and toward a policy favorable to hard money.

In his First Annual Address in December 1829, Jackson openly challenged the Bank by questioning its constitutionality and the soundness of its money. Jackson's supporters further alleged that it gave preferential loans to speculators and merchants over artisans and farmers, that it used its money to bribe congressmen and the press, and that it had ties with foreign creditors. Biddle responded to Jackson's challenge in early 1830 by using the Bank's vast financial holding to ensure the Bank's reputation, and his supporters argued that the Bank was the key to prosperity and stable commerce. By the time of the 1832 election, Biddle had spent over $250,000,, in printing pamphlets, lobbying for pro-Bank legislation, hiring agents and giving loans to editors and congressmen.

On the surface, Jackson's and Biddle's positions did not appear irreconcilable. Jackson seemed open to keeping the Bank if it could include some degree of Federal oversight, limit its real estate holdings, and have its property subject to taxation by the states. Many of Jackson's cabinet members thought a compromise was possible. In 1831, Treasury Secretary Louis McLane told Biddle that Jackson was open to chartering a modified version of the Bank, but Biddle did not consult Jackson directly. Privately, Jackson expressed opposition to the Bank; publicly, he announced that he would leave the decision concerning the Bank in the hands of the people. Biddle was finally convinced to take open action by Henry Clay, who had decided to run for president against Jackson in the 1832 election. Biddle would agree to seek renewal of the charter two years earlier than scheduled. Clay argued that Jackson was in a bind. If he vetoed the charter, he would loose the votes of his pro-Bank constituents in Pennsylvania; but if he signed the charter, he would lose his anti-Bank constituents. After the recharter bill was passed, Jackson vetoed it on July 10, 1832, arguing that the country should not surrender the will of the majority to the desires of the wealthy.

Election of 1832

The 1832 presidential election demonstrated the rapid development of political parties during Jackson's presidency. The Democratic Party's first national convention, held in Baltimore, nominated Jackson's choice for vice president, Martin Van Buren. The National Republican Party, which had held its first convention in Baltimore earlier in December 1831, nominated Clay, now a senator from Kentucky, and John Sergeant of Pennsylvania. An Anti-Masonic Party with a platform built around opposition to Freemasonry, it supported neither Jackson nor Clay, who both were Masons. The party nominated William Wirt of Maryland and Amos Ellmaker of Pennsylvania.

In addition to the votes Jackson would lose because of the Bank veto, Clay hoped that Jackson's Indian Removal Act would alienate voters in the East; but Jackson's losses were offset by the Act's popularity in the West and Southwest. Clay had also expected that Jackson would lose votes because of his stand on internal improvements. Jackson had vetoed the Maysville Road bill, which funded an upgrade of a section of the National Road in Clay's state of Kentucky; as part of his justification, Jackson claimed it was unconstitutional to fund internal improvements using national funds for local projects.

Clay's strategy failed. Jackson was able to mobilize the Democratic Party's strong political networks. The Northeast supported Jackson because he was in favor of maintaining a stiff tariff; the West supported him because the Indian Removal Act reduced the number of Native Americans in the region and made available more public land. Except for South Carolina, which passed the Ordinance of Nullification during the election month and refused to support any party by giving its votes to the future Governor of Virginia John B. Floyd, the South supported Jackson for implementing the Indian Removal Act, as well as for his willingness to compromise by signing the Tariff of 1832. Jackson won the election by a landslide, receiving 55 percent of the popular vote and 219 electoral votes.

Removal of deposits and censure

Jackson saw his victory as a mandate to continue his war on the Bank's control over the national economy. In 1833, Jackson signed an executive order ending the deposit of Treasury receipts in the bank. When Secretary of the Treasury McLane refused to execute the order, Jackson replaced him with William J. Duane, who also refused. Jackson then appointed Roger B. Taney as acting secretary, who implemented Jackson's policy. With the loss of federal deposits, the Bank had to contract its credit. Biddle used this contraction to create an economic downturn in an attempt to get Jackson to compromise. Biddle wrote, "Nothing but the evidence of suffering abroad will produce any effect in Congress." The attempt did not succeed, the economy recovered and Biddle was blamed for the recession.

Jackson's actions led those who disagreed with him to form the Whig Party. They claimed to oppose Jackson's expansion of executive power, calling him "King Andrew the First", and naming their party after the English Whigs who opposed the British monarchy in the 17th century. In March 1832, the Senate censured Jackson for inappropriately taking authority for the Treasury Department when it was the responsibility of Congress and refused to confirm Taney's appointment as secretary of the treasury. In April, however, the House declared that the bank should not be rechartered. By July 1836, the Bank no longer held any federal deposits.

Jackson had Federal funds deposited into state banks friendly to the administration's policies, which critics called pet banks. The number of these state banks more than doubled during Jackson's administration, and investment patterns changed. The Bank, which had been the federal government's fiscal agent, invested heavily in trade and financed interregional and international trade. State banks were more responsive to state governments, and invested heavily in land development, land speculation, and state public works projects. In spite of the efforts of Taney's successor, Levi Woodbury, to control them, the pet banks expanded their loans, helping to create a speculative boom in the final years of Jackson's administration.

In January 1835, Jackson paid off the national debt, the only time in U.S. history that it had been accomplished. It was paid down through tariff revenues, carefully managing federal funding of internal improvements like roads and canals, and the sale of public lands. Between 1834 and 1836, the government had unprecedented spike in land sales: At its peak in 1836, the profits from land sales were eight to twelve times higher than a typical year. During Jackson's presidency, 63 million acres of public land—about the size of the state of Oklahoma—was sold. After Jackson stepped down from the presidency in 1837, a Democrat-majority Senate expunged Jackson's censure.

Panic of 1837

Despite the economic boom following Jackson's victory in the Bank War, land speculation in the west caused the Panic of 1837.  Jackson's transfer of federal monies to state banks in 1833 caused western banks to relax their lending standards; the Indian Removal Act made large amounts of former Native American lands available for purchase and speculation. Two of Jackson's acts in 1836 contributed to the Panic of 1837. One was the Specie Circular, which mandated western lands only be purchased by money backed by specie. The act was intended to stabilize the economy by reducing speculation on credit, but it caused a drain of gold and silver from the Eastern banks to the Western banks to address the needs of financing land transactions. The other was the Deposit and Distribution Act, which transferred federal monies from eastern to western state banks.  Together, they left Eastern banks unable to pay specie to the British when they recalled their loans to address their economic problems in international trade. The panic drove the U.S. economy into a depression that lasted until 1841.

Physical assault and assassination attempt

Jackson was the first president to be subjected to physical assault as well an assassination attempt. On May 6, 1833, Robert B. Randolph struck Jackson in the face with his hand because Jackson had ordered Randolph's dismissal from the navy for embezzlement. Jackson declined to press charges. While leaving the United States Capitol on January 30, 1835, Richard Lawrence, an unemployed house painter from England, aimed a pistol at Jackson, which misfired. Lawrence pulled out a second pistol, which also misfired. Jackson attacked Lawrence with his cane until others intervened to restrain Lawrence, who was later found not guilty by reason of insanity and institutionalized.

Slavery
During Jackson's presidency, slavery remained a minor political issue. Though federal troops were used to crush Nat Turner's slave rebellion in 1831, Jackson ordered them withdrawn immediately afterwards despite the petition of local citizens for them to remain for protection. Jackson considered the issue too divisive to the nation and to the delicate alliances of the Democratic Party, while sympathetic newspapers argued for excluding slavery from federal politics and keeping it at the state level.

Jackson's view was challenged when the American Anti-Slavery Society formally agitated for abolition by sending anti-slavery tracts through the postal system into the South in 1835. Jackson condemned these agitators as "monsters" who should atone with their lives because they were attempting to destroy the Union by encouraging sectionalism. The act provoked riots in Charleston, and pro-slavery Southerners demanded that the postal service ban distribution of the materials. To address the issue, Jackson authorized that the tracts could be sent only to subscribers, whose names could be made publicly accountable. That December, Jackson called on Congress to prohibit the circulation through the South of "incendiary publications intended to instigate the slaves to insurrection".

Foreign affairs

The Jackson administration successfully negotiated trade agreements with Great Britain, Spain, Russia, the Ottoman Empire, and Siam. In his First Annual Message to Congress, Jackson addressed the issues of spoliation claims, demands of compensation for the capture of American ships and sailors by foreign nations during the Napoleonic Wars. Using a combination of bluster and tact, he successfully settled these claims with Denmark, Portugal, and Spain, but he had difficulty collecting spoliation claims from France, which was unwilling to pay an indemnity agreed to in an earlier treaty. Jackson asked Congress in 1834 to authorize reprisals against French property if the country failed to make payment, as well as to arm for defense. In response, France put its Caribbean fleet on a wartime footing. Both sides wanted to avoid a conflict, but the French wanted an apology for Jackson's belligerence. In his 1835 Annual Message to the Congress, Jackson asserted that he refused to apologize, but stated that he did not intend to "menace or insult the Government of France". The French were assuaged and agreed to pay $5,000,000 to settle the claims.

Since the early 1820s, large numbers of Americans had been immigrating into Texas, a territory of the newly independent nation of Mexico. As early as 1824, Jackson had expressed a desire to acquire the region for the United States. In 1829, he attempted to purchase it, but Mexico did not want to sell. By 1830, there were twice as many settlers from the United States as from Mexico, leading to tensions with the Mexican government that started the Texas Revolution. During the conflict, Jackson covertly allowed the settlers to obtain weapons and money from the United States. They defeated the Mexican military in April 1836 and soon afterward declared the region an independent country, the Republic of Texas. The new Republic asked Jackson to recognize and annex it. Although Jackson wanted to do so, he was hesitant because he was unsure it could maintain independence from Mexico. He also was concerned because Texas had legalized slavery, which was an issue that could divide the Democrats during the 1836 election. Jackson recognized the Republic of Texas on the last full day of his presidency, March 3, 1837.

Judicial appointments

Jackson appointed six justices to the Supreme Court. Most were undistinguished. Jackson nominated Roger B. Taney in January 1835 to the Court in reward for his services, but the nomination failed to win Senate approval. When Chief Justice Marshall died in 1835, Jackson nominated Taney for Chief Justice; he was confirmed by the new Senate, serving as Chief Justice until 1864. He was regarded with respect during his career on the bench, but he is most remembered for his decision in Dred Scott v. Sandford.

States admitted to the Union
Two new states were admitted into the Union during Jackson's presidency: Arkansas (June 15, 1836) and Michigan (January 26, 1837). Both states increased Democratic power in Congress and helped Van Buren win the presidency in 1836, as new states tended to support the party that had done the most to admit them.

Later life and death (1837–1845)

In 1837, Jackson retired to the Hermitage and immediately began putting its affairs in order, as it had been poorly managed in his absence. Though Jackson was in ill health and had lost some of his popularity because he was blamed for the Panic of 1837, he remained influential in national and state politics.

Jackson supported an Independent Treasury system as a solution to the panic, which would hold the money balances of the government in the form of gold or silver and would be restricted from printing paper money to prevent further inflation. This system was implemented in 1846. The depression still continued, and Van Buren became unpopular. The Whig Party nominated war hero William Henry Harrison and former Democrat John Tyler for the 1840 presidential election. They used a campaign style similar to that of the Democrats: Van Buren was depicted as an uncaring aristocrat, while Harrison's war record was glorified, and he was portrayed as a man of the people. Jackson campaigned loyally for Van Buren in Tennessee. He favored James K. Polk as vice presidential candidate, but no candidate for that office was chosen.

To Jackson's dismay, Harrison won the 1840 election with the Whigs capturing majorities in both houses of Congress. Harrison died only a month into his term, and was replaced by Tyler. Jackson was encouraged because Tyler was not bound to party loyalties. Tyler angered the Whigs in 1841 when he vetoed two Whig-sponsored bills to establish a new national bank. Jackson and other Democrats praised Tyler, but Tyler's entire cabinet, except Daniel Webster, resigned.

Jackson lobbied for the annexation of Texas, insisting that it belonged to the United States as part of the Louisiana Purchase. He thought that annexation would cause national division over slavery, but feared the British could use Texas as a base to threaten the United States. Jackson wrote several letters to Texas president Sam Houston, urging him to wait for the Senate to approve annexation and explaining how much Texas would benefit as a part of the United States. Tyler signed a treaty of annexation in April 1844, but it became associated with the expansion of slavery and was not ratified. Henry Clay, the Whig nominee for the 1844 presidential election, and Van Buren, Jackson's preferred candidate for the Democratic Party, both opposed annexation. Disappointed by Van Buren, Jackson convinced Polk, who was to be Van Buren's running mate, to run as the Democratic Party's presidential nominee instead. Polk defeated Van Buren for the nomination, and Jackson convinced Tyler not to run as an independent by bringing him back into the Democratic Party. Polk won the election, the Senate passed a bill to annex Texas, and it was signed on March 1, 1845.

Jackson died of dropsy, tuberculosis and heart failure at 78 years of age on June 8, 1845. He was surrounded by family and friends at his deathbed, and his last words were, "Oh, do not cry. Be good children and we will all meet in Heaven." He was buried in the same tomb as his wife Rachel.

Personal life

Family
Jackson and Rachel had no children together but adopted Andrew Jackson Jr., the son of Rachel's deceased brother Severn Donelson. The Jacksons acted as guardians for Donelson's other children: John Samuel, Daniel Smith, and Andrew Jackson. They were also guardians for Andrew Jackson Hutchings, Rachel's orphaned grand nephew, and the orphaned children of a friend, Edward Butler – Caroline, Eliza, Edward, and Anthony – who lived with the Jacksons after their father died. Jackson also had three Creek children living with them: Lyncoya, a Creek orphan Jackson had adopted after the Battle of Tallushatchee, and two boys they called Theodore and Charley.

For the only time in U.S. history, two women acted simultaneously as unofficial First Lady for the widower Jackson. Rachel's niece Emily Donelson was married to Andrew Jackson Donelson (who acted as Jackson's private secretary) and served as hostess at the White House. The president and Emily became estranged for over a year during the Petticoat affair, but they eventually reconciled and she resumed her duties as White House hostess. Sarah Yorke Jackson, the wife of Andrew Jackson Jr., became co-hostess of the White House in 1834, and took over all hostess duties after Emily died from tuberculosis in 1836.

Temperament
Jackson had a reputation for being short-tempered and violent, which terrified his opponents. He was able to use his temper strategically to accomplish what he wanted. He could keep it in check when necessary: his behavior was friendly and urbane when he went to Washington as senator during the campaign leading up to the 1824 election. According to Van Buren, he remained calm in times of difficulty and made his decisions deliberatively.

He had the tendency to take things personally. If someone crossed him, he would often become obsessed with crushing them. For example, on the last day of his presidency, Jackson declared he had only two regrets: that he had not hanged Henry Clay or shot John C. Calhoun. He also had a strong sense of loyalty. He considered threats to his friends as threats to himself, but he demanded unquestioning loyalty in return.

Jackson was self-confident, without projecting a sense of self-importance. This self-confidence gave him the ability to persevere in the face of adversity. Once he decided on a plan of action, he would adhere to it. His reputation for being both quick-tempered and confident worked to his advantage; it misled opponents to see him as simple and direct, leading them to often understimate his political shrewdness.

Religious faith
In 1838, Jackson became an official member of the First Presbyterian Church in Nashville. Both his mother and his wife had been devout Presbyterians all their lives, but Jackson stated that he had postponed officially entering the church until after his retirement to avoid accusations that he had done so for political reasons.

Legacy

Jackson's legacy is controversial and polarized. Jackson's contemporary, Alexis de Tocqueville depicted Jackson as the spokesperson of the majority and their passions. He has been variously described as a frontiersman personifying the independence of the American West, a slave-owning member of the Southern gentry, and a populist who promoted faith in the wisdom of the ordinary citizen.  He has been represented as a statesman who substantially advanced the spirit of democracyand upheld the foundations of American constitutionalism, as well as an autocratic demagogue who  crushed political opposition and trampled the law.

In the 1920s, Jackson's rise to power became associated with the idea of the "common man". This idea defined the age as a populist rejection of social elites and a vindication of every person's value independent of class and status. Jackson was seen as its personification, an individual free of societal constraints who can achieve great things. In 1945, Arthur M. Schlesinger Jr.'s influential Age of Jackson redefined Jackson's legacy through the lens of Franklin D. Roosevelt's New Deal, describing the common man as a member of the working class struggling against exploitation by business concerns.

In the twenty-first century, Jackson's Indian Removal Act has been described as ethnic cleansing: the use of force, terror and violence to make an area ethnically homogeneous. To achieve the goal of separating Native Americans from the whites, coercive force such as threats and bribes were used to effect removal  and unauthorized military force was used when there was resistance, as in the case of the Second Seminole War. The act has been discussed in the context of genocide, and its role in the long-term destruction of Native American societies and their cultures continues to be debated.

His legacy has been variously used by later presidents. Abraham Lincoln referenced Jackson's ideas when negotiating the challenges to the Union that he faced during 1861, including Jackson's understanding of the constitution during the nullification crisis and the president's right to interpret the constitution. Franklin D. Roosevelt used Jackson to redefine the Democratic Party, describing him as a defender of the exploited and downtrodden and as a fighter for social justice and human rights. Donald Trump used Jackson's legacy to present himself as the president of the common man, praising Jackson for saving the country from a rising aristocracy and protecting American workers with a tariff. In 2016, President Barack Obama's administration announced it was removing Jackson's portrait from the $20 bill and replacing it with one of Harriet Tubman. Though the plan was put on hold during Trump's presidency, President Joe Biden's administration resumed it in 2021.

Jackson usually rated highly as a president, but his reputation is dropping. His contradictory legacy is shown in opinion polls. A 2014 survey of political scientists rated Jackson was the ninth-highest rated president, but the third-most polarizing. He was also rated the third-most overrated president.  In a C-SPAN poll, Jackson was ranked the 13th in 2009, 18th in 2017, and 22nd in 2021.

Writings
  (11 volumes to date; 17 volumes projected). Ongoing project to print all of Jackson's papers.
 Vol. I, (1770–1803); Vol. II, (1804–1813); Vol. III, (1814–1815); Vol. IV, (1816–1820); Vol. V, (1821–1824); Vol. VI, (1825–1828); Vol. VII, (1829); Vol. VIII, (1830); Vol. IX, (1831); Vol. X, (1832); Vol. XI, (1833)
  (7 volumes; 2 available online).
 Vol III, (1820-1828) ; Vol IV, (1829-1832) 
  Reprints Jackson's major messages and reports.

Notes

References

Bibliography

Biographies

Books

 
 
 
 
 
 
 
 
 
 
 
 
 
 
 
 
 
 
 
 
 
 
 
 
 
 
 
 
 
 
 
 
 
 
 
 
 
 
 *

Journal articles and dissertations

Primary Sources

External links

 Scholarly coverage of Jackson at Miller Center, U of Virginia 

 
 
 
 The Papers of Andrew Jackson at the Avalon Project
 The Hermitage, home of President Andrew Jackson
  A digital archive providing access to manuscript images of many of Jackson's documents.

 
1767 births
1845 deaths
18th-century American politicians
18th-century Presbyterians
19th-century American politicians
19th-century deaths from tuberculosis
19th-century presidents of the United States
United States Army personnel of the War of 1812
American militia generals
American people of Scotch-Irish descent
American planters
American Presbyterians
American prosecutors
American Revolutionary War prisoners of war held by Great Britain
American shooting survivors
American slave owners
Burials in Tennessee
Andrew Jackson family
Congressional Gold Medal recipients
Deaths from edema
Democratic Party presidents of the United States
Democratic Party (United States) presidential nominees
Democratic-Republican Party members of the United States House of Representatives from Tennessee
Democratic-Republican Party United States senators
American duellists
Florida Democratic-Republicans
American Freemasons
Governors of Florida Territory
American people of English descent
Grand Masters of the Grand Lodge of Tennessee
Hall of Fame for Great Americans inductees
1830s in the United States
Infectious disease deaths in Tennessee
Negro Fort
Members of the American Antiquarian Society
North Carolina lawyers
People from Lancaster County, South Carolina
People from Nashville, Tennessee
People of pre-statehood Tennessee
People of the Creek War
Presidents of the United States
Second Party System
Tennessee Democrats
Tennessee Jacksonians
Justices of the Tennessee Supreme Court
United States Army generals
United States Army personnel of the Seminole Wars
United States military governors
Candidates in the 1824 United States presidential election
Candidates in the 1828 United States presidential election
Candidates in the 1832 United States presidential election
United States senators from Tennessee
Tuberculosis deaths in Tennessee
United States senators who owned slaves